The Bella Tola is a mountain of the Swiss Pennine Alps, overlooking Saint-Luc in the canton of Valais. With an elevation of 3,025 metres above sea level, it is the highest summit of the subrange north of the Meidpass (2,790 m). The Bella Tola lies near the northern end of the Weisshorn chain.

On the north side lies a small glacier named Bella Tola Gletscher.

The summit of the Bella Tola is a popular vantage point, it can be reached by several trails.

References

External links
Bella Tola on Hikr
Bella Tola on Summitpost

Mountains of the Alps
Alpine three-thousanders
Mountains of Valais
Mountains of Switzerland